"Sweet Wine" is a song written by Reece Kirk and recorded by New Zealand-born singer songwriter, Mark Williams. The song was released in October 1975 as the lead single from his second studio album, Sweet Trials (1976). The song peaked at number 7 on the New Zealand charts.

Reception
In an album review from Victoria University of Wellington by Suedo Nim, Nim said; "Reece Kirk's "Sweet Wine" is the only local song that draws significant attention and is at least memorable. Although it had a lot of airplay and wasn't very well received as a single, "Sweet Wine" is a product of fresh original talent and unreservedly highlights the album. Only a few other songs do justice to Mark's soulful vocals."

Track listing
 7" single (EMI – HR 546)
Side A: "Sweet Wine"
Side B: "Who Do You Think You Are"

Chart performance

References

1975 singles
1975 songs
Mark Williams (singer) songs
EMI Records singles